Arbelaezaster is a genus of flowering plants in the daisy family.

There is only one known species, Arbelaezaster ellsworthii, native to Colombia and Venezuela.

References

Monotypic Asteraceae genera
Senecioneae
Flora of South America